Milton Wolff (October 7, 1915 – January 14, 2008) was an American veteran of the Spanish Civil War, the last commander of the Lincoln Battalion of XV International Brigade, and a prominent communist.

Early life
He was born into a working class Jewish immigrant family in Brooklyn, New York. His parents originally came from Lithuania and Hungary. He was also a member of the Civilian Conservation Corps during the Great Depression. He became active in the Young Communist League on returning to Brooklyn after the CCC. It was there that he volunteered to go to Spain to fight fascism.

Spanish Civil War
In early 1937, Wolff set off to join the International Brigades in Spain, reaching Albacete by March. As a pacifist, a belief common in the 1930s, he originally wished to be a medic. However, after the International Brigades' heavy losses at the Battle of Jarama, he became a soldier instead, joining a machine gun company. "Largely self-educated, ... [he] was an intellectual". He "detested elegant uniforms", customarily wearing "baggy trousers, a stained leather jacket" and, in wet weather, a "woolly poncho".

After a year's fighting in Brunete, Belchite and Teruel, the Brigade lost two senior officers, David Doran and Robert Hale Merriman at the Gandesa battle on the Aragon front. After which, in March 1938, Wolff became the battalion commander. He led the now Lincoln-Washington Battalion during the Battle of the Ebro and left Spain in November 1938 when the International Brigades were demobilized. Ernest Hemingway described him during this period: [he was] "...23 years old, tall as Lincoln, gaunt as Lincoln, and as brave and as good a soldier as any that commanded battalions at Gettysburg. He is alive and unhit by the same hazard that leaves one tall palm tree standing where a hurricane has passed."

World War II
In 1940, Wolff volunteered for the British Special Operations Executive, and arranged arms for the European resistance organizations. After the United States' entry into World War II, Wolff volunteered for the infantry in June 1942.

He saw action at the end of 1943 in Burma. There, General "Wild Bill" Donovan met him and assigned him to the O.S.S. to work with anti-fascist partisans in occupied Italy.

Later life
Wolff appeared before the House Un-American Activities Committee to defend VALB (Veterans of the Abraham Lincoln Brigade) from being banned as a Communist front organization. His explanation for his actions owed to his ancestry: "I am Jewish, and knowing that as a Jew we are the first to suffer when fascism does come, I went to Spain to fight against it."

According to historian Peter Carroll:

When Congress passed the McCarran Act in 1950, obliging all designated subversive organizations to register with the federal government and creating heavy penalties for leaders who refused to cooperate, the entire executive committee of the VALB resigned in 1950. In its place, two Lincoln veterans stepped forward: Wolff became the National Commander; Moe Fishman became the Executive Secretary/Treasurer and served the organization in an executive capacity for the rest of his life.

Wolff also battled fiercely for civil rights and against the Vietnam War. He even offered the services of the aging veterans of the Lincoln Brigade to the North Vietnamese leader, Ho Chi Minh, who declined them. Later, Wolff campaigned against apartheid in South Africa, and raised money for ambulances in Sandinista-ruled Nicaragua in the 1980s, personally delivering twenty of them. Wolff completed two autobiographical novels, A Member Of The Working Class (published 2005) about his early life in New York, and Another Hill (published 1994) about his communist and Spanish experiences; he began a third book, The Premature Anti-Fascist, describing his experiences after leaving Spain and during World War II, but did not finish it before his death.

Personal life
Wolff married and had two children. His family resided primarily in Stony Creek, Connecticut. His first marriage ended in divorce. Wolff and his second wife are both buried at the Sunset View Cemetery in El Cerrito.

Books by Milton Wolff
Another Hill: An Autobiographical Novel (1994; University of Illinois Press, 2001).  
A Member of the Working Class  (iUniverse, 2005).

References

Sources
 Abraham Lincoln Brigade Archives (2008). Jewish Volunteers in the Spanish Civil War Accessed: March 11, 2010.
 Davidson, Jo (1939). Spanish Portraits. Georgian Press.
 Eby, Cecil (2007). Comrades and Commissars: The Lincoln Battalion in the Spanish Civil War. Pennsylvania State University Press. 
 Martin, Douglas (2008). "Milton Wolff, 92, Dies; Anti-Franco Leader", New York Times, January 17, 2008 (accessed: March 11, 2010)
 Merriman, Marion; Lerude, Warren (1986). American Commander in Spain. Reno: University of Nevada Press.

External links
 Abraham Lincoln Brigade Archives/Veterans of the Abraham Lincoln Brigade
 New York Times Obituary
 "He Remembers Papa"
Milton Wolff Papers at Tamiment Library and Robert F. Wagner Labor Archives

1915 births
2008 deaths
Special Operations Executive personnel
American communists
Jewish American writers
Jewish socialists
Abraham Lincoln Brigade members
People of the Office of Strategic Services
Civilian Conservation Corps people
People from El Cerrito, California
People from Brooklyn
People from Stony Brook, New York
Jewish anti-fascists
American anti-fascists
United States Army personnel of World War II
American people of Hungarian-Jewish descent
American people of Lithuanian-Jewish descent
Members of the Communist Party USA